Eukaryotic translation initiation factor 4E family member 1B is a protein in humans that is encoded by the EIF4E1B gene.

References

Further reading 

Genes on human chromosome 5